Lorenz Lemlin (also: Laurentius Lemlin; ca. 1495 – ca. 1549) was a German composer of the Renaissance.

Lemlin studied in Heidelberg, and was a singer and later Kapellmeister of the Hofkantorei there. Among his pupils was Georg Forster, who published many of Lemlin's lieder in his collection Frische teutsche Liedlein, as well as Jobst von Brandt, Caspar Othmayr, and Stefan Zirler. Another of Lemlin's works is: Der Gutzgauch auf dem Zaune saß.

References
Carlton M. Hughes, Enter His Court With Singing. Writers Club Press 2000, 
Robert Eitner, Lemlin, Lorenz. In: Allgemeine Deutsche Biographie (ADB). Volume 18, Duncker & Humblot, Leipzig 1883, .

External links

1490s births
1540s deaths
German classical composers
Renaissance composers
German male classical composers